R. Alexandra (Alex) Keith (born 1968) is an American businesswoman, and CEO of Procter & Gamble's global beauty division.

Early life
Keith earned a bachelor's degree in chemical engineering from the University of Arizona in 1989.

Career
Keith joined P&G in 1989. She spent her first seven years in manufacturing and logistics, before moving into marketing.

From 2010 to 2014, Keith worked in the fabric care division of P&G. Then, from 2014 to 2017, Keith was head of the skin and personal care division.

Keith became president of Procter & Gamble's $11.4 billion global beauty business in July 2017, when she succeeded Patrice Louvet. In November 2018, she was promoted to CEO of P&G's global beauty division, effective July 2019.

For five consecutive years, Keith has been named to Fortune's international list of most powerful women in business, first entering the roster at #26 in 2017.

In May 2020, Keith joined other business people and celebrities for a virtual commencement event hosted by Her Campus in lieu of in-person graduation ceremonies cancelled due to COVID-19 concerns.

As of June 2021, Keith is on the boards of Thermo Fisher Scientific, Cosmetic Executive Women (CEW) and Personal Care Products Council.

Personal life
Keith married in 2006.

References

Living people
Procter & Gamble people
American women in business
University of Arizona alumni
1960s births
21st-century American women